TopenLand Football Club, known as TopenLand Binh Dinh for sponsorship reasons, is a Vietnamese professional association football club based in Quy Nhơn, Bình Định Province that plays in the top tier of Vietnamese football, the V.League 1. Their home stadium is Quy Nhơn Stadium which has a capacity of 25,000.

Honours
League
V.League 1:
 Third place: 2006, 2022
V.League 2:
  Winners: 2001, 2020 
 Runners-up: 2010, 2011
Second League:
 Winners: 2017
 Runners-up: 2016
Cup
Vietnamese Cup:
 Winners: 2003, 2004
 Runners-up: 2007,  2022
 Ho Chi Minh City Cup
 Winners: 2021

Performance in AFC competitions
AFC Champions League: 2 appearances
2004: Group stage
2005: Group stage

Current squads
As of January 2023

(C)

Out on loan

Kit suppliers and shirt sponsors

Managers
  Phan Kim Lân (1981–90)
  Dương Ngọc Hùng (2003–04, 2006–07, 2008–10)
  Arjhan Srong-ngamsub (2005)
  Nguyễn Ngọc Thiện (2008, 2010–11)
  Phan Tôn Quyền (2010)
  Trần Kim Đức (2011)
  Hoàng Văn Gia (2011–12)
  Trần Kim Đức (2012)
  Nguyễn Văn Hùng (2012–13)
  Nguyễn Thành Lợi (2013–2017)
  Bùi Đoàn Quang Huy (2018–2019)
  Nguyễn Đức Thắng (2020–)

References

External links
Fans club site

Football clubs in Vietnam
Association football clubs established in 1975
Bình Định province
1975 establishments in Vietnam